The Irish League in season 1921–22 comprised 6 teams, and Linfield won the championship.

League standings

Results

References
Northern Ireland - List of final tables (RSSSF)

NIFL Premiership seasons
North
Football
Football
1921–22 in Northern Ireland association football